Kraasna is an extinct dialect of South Estonian that was spoken in Russia by the Kraasna Estonians who were immigrants to the area. The last native speaker died before World War two, but it was still spoken in the 1930s. Kraasna was documented by Oskar Kallas (along with Ludza).

The linguistic enclave was south of the Russian city of Pskov. Kraasna, like the Seto dialect, have been influenced by Russian. The Kraasna dialect was first discovered in the year 1849 when F.R. Kreutzwald sent a letter to A.J. Brandt. The Kraasna Estonians arrived to the area at the end of the 16th century which was close to eastern Seto, but had slight influence from Võro. The Kraasna dialect had an abessive suffix -ldA and the translative marker -st which are linked to Seto.

Example

See also 
Leivu dialect
Ludza dialect

External links 
Recording of Kraasna

References 

South Estonian language
Estonian dialects